The Calor Village of the Year comprised 4 annual competitions organised by gas provider Calor to identify the villages that best met the following criteria: "a well-balanced, pro-active, caring community which has made the best of local opportunities to maintain and enhance the quality of life for all residents".

Four separate competitions were run:
 Calor Scottish Community of the Year
 Calor Village of the Year for England
 Calor Village of the Year for Wales
 Calor Village of the Year Northern Ireland

The competitions began in 1997 and ran yearly until 2009. Some 1,650 villages entered the competitions each year.

List 
Winners included:
 Ashington, West Sussex
 Ashover, Derbyshire
 Coniston, Cumbria
 St Neot, Cornwall
 Sutton-in-the-Isle, Cambridgeshire
 Tedburn St Mary, Devon

External links
Official web site

British awards
English awards
Scottish awards
Welsh awards
1997 establishments in the United Kingdom
2009 disestablishments in the United Kingdom
Awards established in 1997
Annual events in the United Kingdom
Community awards